Private Master is a 1967 Indian Telugu-language drama film directed by K. Viswanath. The titular private master is played by Ram Mohan with Krishna as the main antagonist. The film title Private Master is special for its use of English in an era of Telugu-only titles. The producer decided to use an English title which in Telugu means "Tuition Teacher".

Plot
Sridhar Rao appears as a wealthy man with two daughters, Sundari and Raaji. Prasad Rao is appointed as a private master for Raaji. While tutoring Raaji, Prasad falls in love with Sundari. Sundari and Prasad decide to marry with the permission of their elders. Meanwhile, a young man named Krishna is seeking to make his fortune and is prepared to do anything to achieve his aim. With the help of his friends, Bobby and Jaya, Krishna traps Sridhar Rao and wants to become his son-in-law. Sridhar is tempted to forget the help he got from Jagannath Rao, father of Prasad Rao, and marries daughter Sundari to Krishna. A conflict arises for Sundari, whose true love is Prasad.

Grandfather Relangi comes to the rescue and helps Sundari and Prasad marry in a temple. To ease the tension and save the family prestige, Raaji convinces Krishna to marry her instead of Sundari.
Sridhar Rao throws Sundari out of the family home, leaving Sundari and Prasad to start their new lives in poverty, while, Krishna, having married Raaji, begins accumulating personal riches from the Rao family. Krishna and Prasad Rao fail in their schemes to earn money. Prasad and Sundari recruit Sundari's grandfather to help expose Krishna and his friends. The film concludes with Prasad and Sundari reunited with the Rao family.

Cast

Soundtrack
There are 8 songs in the film with music composed by K. V. Mahadevan.

References

External links
 

1967 films
1960s Telugu-language films
Indian black-and-white films
Films directed by K. Viswanath
Films scored by K. V. Mahadevan